San Mauro Torinese is an Italian comune  in the Metropolitan City of Turin in the Piedmont region. It is bordered by the territories of Settimo Torinese, Castiglione Torinese, Turin, and Baldissero Torinese.

History

The first written record of Pulchra Rada (the ancient name for San Mauro, which in Latin means "beautiful beach and/or port" - on the Po river) dates from 4 May 991. On that day Anselmo (at the time the ruler of Montferrat) gave the order to rebuild a Benedictine monastery, erected originally above a pre-existing ancient Roman settlement, that had been destroyed by a Saracen invasion.

The abbey became especially prosperous in the 12th century, after which it started to decline due to the continuous strife between the bordering Marquisate of Montferrat and Duchy of Savoy. In 1474 it was therefore suppressed and turned into in commendam. The way was owned by the Benedictinese until 1603 when it was transferred to secular clergy. The convent was suppressed again by Pope Pius VI in 1803.

Bridge Victor Emmanuel III, connecting San Mauro to Bertolla, locally known as ponte vecchio (old bridge), was inaugurated on 8 September 1912.

Main sights
Pulcherada Abbey
Parish church of Santa Maria
Natural Park of Superga Hill

Twin towns
 Mirande, France
 L'Eliana, Spain

References

External links
 Official website